The Fourth cabinet of Davíð Oddsson in Iceland was formed 23 May 2003.

Cabinets

Inaugural cabinet: 23 May 2003 – 31 December 2003

Reshuffle: 31 December 2003 – 15 September 2004
Þorgerður Katrín Gunnarsdóttir replaced Tómas Ingi Olrich as Minister of Education, Science and Culture.

See also
Government of Iceland
Cabinet of Iceland

References

David Oddsson, Fourth cabinet of
David Oddsson, Fourth cabinet of
David Oddsson, Fourth cabinet of
Cabinets established in 2003
Cabinets disestablished in 2004
Independence Party (Iceland)
Progressive Party (Iceland)